James McCree (16 November 1902 – 21 October 1984) was a Scottish amateur football half back who played in the Football League for West London rivals Brentford and Fulham. Playing for most of his career as an amateur, he also represented Civil Service and London Caledonians, winning the FA Amateur Cup with the latter club in 1923. McCree played for Scotland Amateurs in a match against England Amateurs on 14 March 1930.

Honours 
London Caledonians

 FA Amateur Cup: 1922–23

Career statistics

References 

English Football League players
Brentford F.C. players
Fulham F.C. players
Middlesbrough F.C. players
Civil Service F.C. players
London Caledonians F.C. players
Scotland amateur international footballers
Isthmian League players
Association football midfielders
Scottish footballers
Queen's Park F.C. players
Watford F.C. players
1902 births
1984 deaths
Footballers from Glasgow